ROXs 42Bb is a directly imaged planetary-mass companion to the binary M star ROXs 42B, a likely member of the Rho Ophiuchi cloud complex.  The companion was announced/discovered on October 17, 2013, by University of Toronto astronomer Thayne Currie.

The object has an estimated mass around 9 Jupiter masses, depending on the age of the star, similar to the masses of directly imaged planets around HR 8799 and beta Pictoris. However, it is unclear whether ROXs 42Bb formed like these planets via core accretion, formed by disk (gravitational) instability, or formed more like a binary star. Like Beta Pictoris b, ROXs 42Bb's atmosphere is likely very cloudy and dusty.

See also
 List of largest exoplanets

References

Exoplanets discovered in 2013
Exoplanets detected by direct imaging
Circumbinary planets
Ophiuchus (constellation)